Bavar-373 (meaning Belief and 373 being Abjad for یا رسول‌الله or O, Messenger of Allah!) is an Iranian long-range road-mobile surface-to-air missile system unveiled in August 2016. Iran describes it as a competitor with the S-300 missile system. It is manufactured by the Iranian Defence Ministry in cooperation with unspecified local manufacturers and universities.

The system was formally unveiled during a ceremony attended by the Iranian President Hassan Rouhani on 22 August 2019, and was declared operational the same day.

An upgraded version was unveiled in 2022. Iran described it as a competitor with the S-400 and said it is capable of shooting down Fifth-generation fighter aircraft.

History
After the Russian ban on exporting S-300 to Iran (which was lifted in 2015), Iran decided to develop a similar system domestically: "We have planned to build a long-range air defence missile system similar to S-300. By God's grace and by the Iranian engineers' efforts, we will reach self-sufficiency in this regard."

It was later revealed that the name of the system will be Bavar 373. Bavar meaning "belief" and 373 which is the Abjad number of prophet Muhammad's name.
Farzad Esmaieli, commander of Khatam-ol-Anbia Base told Iranian media that the development of this system started by the direct order of supreme leader Ayatollah Khamenei when the first information about cancellation of S-300 contract was revealed and Iranian personnel were still being trained in Russia on it. He said the project was in the stage of prototype designing and that it was not going to suffer from the weak points of the S-300. He continued that in the area of detection and radars, a very good point was reached and defense ministry was working on two or three missiles each for a different range and altitude. He said that the design was complete, all the parts were going to be manufactured inside the country and it had a good ability to detect and intercept enemy aircraft. According to Iranian military sources, the system is much more capable than S-300P class.

The first prototype was built on 22 November 2011. Iran announced that the system was designed and built by defense ministry, domestic industries and some Iranian universities. Esmaieli said that Iran doesn't even think about S-300 anymore as Bavar-373 was much more capable. Iranian sources suggest that the Bavar 373 will be mobile, with four missiles loaded on each mobile truck launcher.

The Iranian defense ministry is due to equip the country's Armed Forces with a new long-range air-defence system by 21 March 2013, a senior Iranian military official announced on Saturday August 25, 2012. On 3 September 2012, Farzad Esmaili said that the development of the system was now 30 percent complete. On 1 January 2013, the same commander announced that the sub-systems of the homemade air-defense system are being tested in laboratory.

Esmaili updated his estimate in February 2014 and said the system would be ready by the end of 2015.

On 21 August 2016 Iran revealed components of Bavar-373. According to Janes international: "Bavar-373 displayed on 21 August is clearly a unique Iranian system that appears to reflect extensive investment in its ability to develop phased array radars". The system shows vertical, rectangular launch canister with details suggesting a hot launch system, unlike cold launch used in system such as S-300.

On 16 August 2019, the Iranian MOD said the Bavar 373 was ready to be delivered to the Iranian armed forces. On August 22, 2019, Iran unveiled the Bavar-373 during a ceremony in the presence of President Hassan Rouhani, Defense Minister Brigadier General Amir Hatami and other senior military officials. According to the Iranian defence chief, the Bavar-373 "can detect targets or planes at more than 300 km, lock it at about 250 km, and destroy it at 200 km". Iran has for the first time employed its homegrown missile defense system ‘Bavar-373’ in a joint air defense exercise, codenamed ‘Guardians of Velayat Sky-99’, in late October 2020.

In April 2022, reports surfaced which claimed that Iran had transferred a Bavar-373 system to Russia for use in the Russian invasion of Ukraine. Iran Foreign Minister Amir Abdolhainnan refuted allegations of arms transfers to Russia in a call with Ukraine Foreign Minister Dmytro Kuleba.

Design

In April 2015, Iran unveiled some of Bavar's subsystems, which include the Fakour commanding and smart control system which has the ability to collect information from all sources relevant to air defence, including passive and active military radars (such as the Mersad), signal surveillance, missile systems and commanding and control systems.

The Rasoul advanced communications system is for encoding information, connecting the country's infrastructure and transferring radar information from the battle scene to commanding centres.

Bavar-373 will utilize Sayyad-4 missiles, which are contained in two rectangular launch canisters. No formal information was given about this missile but it appears from news photos that Sayyad-4 is similar to Sayyad-3 in wings and control surfaces, however it varies lightly in frontal shape.

The canisters containing the Sayyad-4 missiles are to be carried on the Zoljanah 10×10 truck.

Bavar-373 uses a phased array radar for tracking aerodynamic targets and ballistic missiles in medium to long ranges, mounted on the ZAFAR heavy truck. One of the radars used in Bavar-373 is Meraj-4 (Ascension), a phased array radar with range of 450 km which uses fuzzy logic techniques to spot targets. Meraj can track up to 200 targets simultaneously.

Specifications
Bavar 373 system is capable of detecting up to 100 targets, tracking 60 of them and engage with six concurrently.

Bavar has an S-band acquisition radar for detection, and a (shorter-range) X-Band fire control radar for missile guidance. Both are Active Electronically Scanned Array radars.

Bavar can hit targets up to an altitude of 30 kilometers.

Variants

Upgraded version 
In comments at a televised interview held in August 2021, the former head of the Iranian Defense Ministry’s Aerospace Organization Brigadier General Mahdi Farahi said local experts are developing a new generation of Bavar-373. The latest version of Bavar-373, which will be unveiled soon, has capabilities that outstrip the S-400, General Farahi added. He noted that Iran is making advances in the missile defense industry and can achieve considerable progress in this sector. The general highlighted the Islamic Republic’s advances in missile production, saying the country has made a special liquid fuel for missiles that is as durable as solid fuels, allowing the projectiles to be stored for longer periods of time. The new system has been tested as of October 2022 with a 300 km range. The system has also a detection range risen from 350 to 450 km and a tracking range increased from 260 to 400 km. Its solid fuel missile, named Sayyad-4B, was revealed on 6 November 2022.

Export version 
AD-200 is the export version of Bavar 373.

Operators 
 - Islamic Republic of Iran Air Defense Force
 - Syrian Air Defense Force

See also 
 Equipment of the Iranian Army
 Military of Iran
 Raad
 Khordad 15
 Sayyad-2
 Ya Zahra

References 

21st-century surface-to-air missiles
Surface-to-air missiles of Iran
Military equipment introduced in the 2010s
Anti-ballistic missiles of Iran